L'ange Noir is a French drama film directed and written by Jean-Claude Brisseau.

Plot
Stephane is a woman married to a judge. She kills the legendary gangster Aslanian with the help of her maid. She was having an affair with Aslanian yet she pretends not to have known him and tells the police that she killed him because he raped her. The police arrest Stephane.

Her magistrate husband arranges for a top lawyer, Paul, to defend her. Paul starts looking into her past and discovers that Stephane had a criminal past and was once a prostitute who appeared in pornographic films with Aslanian. Paul falls in love with Stephane and continues to defend her even though he knows that her story of rape is a lie.

Stephane is being blackmailed by someone who threatens to reveal her past. Paul negotiates with the blackmailer's lawyer and arranges a meeting to pay the blackmailer's demands. There, Stephane finds her daughter Cécile, who is the blackmailer and had become Aslanian's lover.

Stephane is acquitted and released. At the party celebrating her acquittal Stephane walks out on her husband, her guests and her life, to a waiting taxi. Cécile
follows her to the taxi and shoots her.

The voice over at the end of the film tells us that Paul has been disbarred, Stephane's maid has left, and Cécile was given a suspended sentence. Stephane's husband has retired and Cécile now manages their estate.

Cast
 Sylvie Vartan : Stephane Feuvrier
 Michel Piccoli : Georges Feuvrier
 Tchéky Karyo : Paul Delorme
 Alexandra Winisky : Cecile
 María Luisa García : Madeleine
 Philippe Torreton : Christophe
 Bernard Verley : Pitot
 Claude Faraldo : Aslanian
 Claude Giraud : Romain Bousquet
 Claude Winter : Madame Pitot

Production
The film was heavily influenced by other movies, including The Paradine Case (1948), Vertigo (1958) and The Letter (1940).

Reception
The film was poorly received critically and commercially.

References

External links

1990s French-language films
French drama films
Films directed by Jean-Claude Brisseau
1994 films
1994 drama films
1990s French films